Marcus Ummidius Quadratus Annianus (138–182) was a Roman Senator and the nephew of the Emperor Marcus Aurelius. He was involved in an unsuccessful plot to assassinate his cousin the Emperor Commodus, which led to his execution afterwards. 

Offices Quadratus Annianus held included legate to the proconsul of Africa, and consul ordinarius in 167 with the emperor Lucius Aurelius Verus.

Life 
Quadratus Annianus was the son of Marcus Aurelius’ sister, Annia Cornificia Faustina and an unnamed Senator. Ronald Syme identifies him with one of the suffect consuls in 146, recorded in the Fasti Ostienses as Gaius Annianus Verus, but having the full name of Gaius Ummidius Quadratus Annianus Verus. He was descended from one of the leading aristocratic and political influential families in Rome and was a direct descendant of the late suffect consul Gaius Ummidius Durmius Quadratus. Through his mother, Quadratus Annianus was related to the ruling Nerva–Antonine dynasty. His sister was Ummidia Cornificia Faustina.

His mother had died sometime between 152 and 158. At her death, Quadratus Annianus and Cornificia Faustina divided their mother's property, making them both very wealthy. After his mother's death, Quadratus took a mistress, a Greek freedwoman named Marcia, who would later become the emperor Commodus' mistress.

Following his consulship, Quadratus adopted the first son of the Senator and philosopher Gnaeus Claudius Severus, who then assumed the name Marcus Claudius Ummidius Quadratus. The reason for the adoption is unknown.

When Marcus Aurelius died in 180, Quadratus' maternal cousin Commodus succeeded him as emperor. Commodus’ sister Lucilla was not happy living as a quiet, private citizen in Rome and became jealous of her brother and her sister-in-law. Further, she became very concerned at Commodus' erratic behavior.

In 182, Lucilla, her daughter Plautia, and her nephew-in-marriage Quintianus, along with Quadratus, his adopted son, and Cornificia Faustina, planned to assassinate Commodus and replace him with Lucilla and her second husband, the consul Tiberius Claudius Pompeianus Quintianus. The involvement of Quadratus, his adopted son and his sister can be explained by a possible dynastic dispute with Commodus, or a possible romantic relationship between Quadratus and Lucilla.

Quintianus burst from his place of hiding with a dagger, trying to stab Commodus. He said to him, "Here is the dagger the senate sends to you", giving away his intentions before he had the chance to act. The guards were faster than he was, and overpowered him. The conspirators were soon revealed; the emperor ordered the deaths of Quadratus Annianus, his adopted son and Quintianus. Commodus may have confiscated Quadratus Annianus’ property and fortune. Lucilla, her daughter, and Cornificia Faustina were banished to the Italian island of Capri. Later that year the Emperor sent a centurion to Capri to execute the three women.

See also
 Ummidia gens

Sources
 Krawczuk, Aleksander. Poczet cesarzowych Rzymu. Warszawa: Iskry. .
 Anthony Richard Birley, Septimius Severus: the African emperor, Second  Edition, 1999
 Anthony Richard Birley, Marcus Aurelius, Routledge, 2000
 Albino Garzetti, From Tiberius to the Antonines: a history of the Roman Empire AD 14-192, 1974
 William M. Ramsay, The Cities and Bishoprics of Phyrgia: Being an Essay of the Local History of Phrygia from the Earliest Times to the Turkish Conquest, Volume One, Part One
 Roman Emperors

References 

138 births
182 deaths
2nd-century Romans
Imperial Roman consuls
Roman governors of Africa
Quadratus Annianus, Marcus